The Qiqihar–Bei'an railway or Qibei railway, is a single-track railroad in northeastern China between Qiqihar and Bei'an in Heilongjiang Province. Major cities and towns along route include Qiqihar, Fuyu, Keshan and Beian.

Line description
In the south, the Qibei railway begins outside the city of Qiqihar in the district of Ang'angxi, at the railroad junction with the Harbin–Manzhouli railway.  It heads northeast to Fuyu, where the Fuyu-Nenjiang (Funen) railway continues northeast and this line turns eastward toward Keshan and Bei'an. At Bei'an, it intersects with the Harbin–Beian railway.

History
In 1909, the Qing Dynasty planned a railway from Jinzhou to Qiqihar to Aihui, which includes a segment that coincides with the Qibei Line.  Wary of Russian and Japanese designs on the region, the Qing government signed a financing agreement with an Anglo-American consortium but the railway was never built.  Actual construction began in June 1928 when northeastern China was ruled by the Republic of China, and the line was planned to run 205 km to Keshan.  The section from Qiqihar to Yi'an entered into operation in January 1931.  The Mukden Incident of September 18, 1931 halted further work on the Qiqihar–Keshan (Qike) railway, as it was known.  In June 1932, the Japanese Kwantung Army resumed construction.   This effort was hampered by attacks and sabotage by partisan forces led by Ma Zhanshan, Su Bingwen and others.  From October 20 to November 10, 1932, Ma's Northeast Anti-Japanese National Salvation Army laid siege to the Laha station before being driven back by Japanese and collaborationist reinforcements. The rest of the line to Be'ian was completed in November 1933.

Stations

See also

 List of railways in China

References

Railway lines in China
Rail transport in Heilongjiang